Off Color Brewing is an American craft beer brewery in the Logan Square neighborhood of Chicago, Illinois. The brewery began in early 2013 as a partnership between John Laffler, formerly with Goose Island Brewery, and Dave Bleitner, formerly with Two Brothers Brewing. The modus operandi of Off Color's founders when they began operation was to focus on brewing forgotten styles of beer, particularly those made in Germany before Reinheitsgebot (i.e. the Bavarian Purity Law) was proclaimed in the late 15th century, effectively condemning myriad styles of beer not made solely with barley, water, and hops.

Beers

See also

 List of microbreweries

References

External links
 

Beer brewing companies based in Chicago
Manufacturing companies based in Chicago
American beer brands